Cybellela is an extinct genus of trilobites in the order Phacopida. It lived during the middle-Ordovician period in Russia.

External links
 Cybellela at the Paleobiology Database

Encrinuridae genera
Ordovician trilobites of Asia
Ordovician trilobites of Europe